Subway Serenade was the second and final album released by the band Looking Glass. It contained their second charting single, "Jimmy Loves Mary-Anne".

Track listing

Personnel
Elliot Lurie—Guitars, vocals
Larry Gonsky—Keyboards, vocals
Piet Sweval—Bass, vocals, harp
 Jeffrey Grob-drums, Vocals and Percussion
Joe Dube--Traps
Maxine Dixon—Additional background vocals
Nancy Nalence—Additional background vocals
Nancy Farrell—Additional background vocals
Steve von Schreiber—Additional background vocals
Ralph MacDonald—Conga and Percussion on Jimmy Loves Mary-Anne and City Lady
Seldon Powell—Saxophone on Sweet Jeremiah
Arif Mardin—Horns and strings arrangements
Peggy Byrnes—Special Thanks
Don Ellis—Special Thanks
James Greene—Engineer
Bill Scruggs—Engineer
Ken Robertson—Engineer
Lew Hahn—Audio
Gene Paul—Audio
Chappell & Co.—Sole selling agent

All songs published by Spruce Run/EvieMusic Co. ASCAP

1973 albums
Looking Glass (band) albums
Albums produced by Arif Mardin
Epic Records albums